James Carson (born 29 April 1994) is a Welsh international field hockey player who plays as a forward for Wales.

Carson plays club hockey in the Men's England Hockey League Premier Division for Old Georgians, along with his two older brothers.

He was picked to represent Wales at the 2023 Hockey World Cup. He became the first player to score a goal for Wales at a Hockey World Cup, during the team's 5-1 loss to Spain on 15 January 2023.

References

1994 births
Living people
Welsh field hockey players